Emanuel Fernando Sheffer Rego (born April 15, 1973) is a male beach volleyball player from Brazil, who competed in five consecutive Summer Olympics, starting in 1996. He won the gold medal in the men's beach team competition at the 2004 Summer Olympics in Athens, Greece, partnering Ricardo Santos. He famously offered his medal to his compatriot Vanderlei de Lima – who won a bronze in the men's marathon after being attacked by Neil Horan – a year later, though it was politely declined.

He was born in Curitiba, and is married (2013) to volleyball Olympic medallist and Senator Leila Barros.

References

External links
 
 
 
 
 

1973 births
Living people
Brazilian men's beach volleyball players
Beach volleyball players at the 1996 Summer Olympics
Beach volleyball players at the 2000 Summer Olympics
Beach volleyball players at the 2004 Summer Olympics
Beach volleyball players at the 2007 Pan American Games
Beach volleyball players at the 2008 Summer Olympics
Beach volleyball players at the 2012 Summer Olympics
Olympic beach volleyball players of Brazil
Olympic gold medalists for Brazil
Olympic silver medalists for Brazil
Olympic bronze medalists for Brazil
Olympic medalists in beach volleyball
Medalists at the 2012 Summer Olympics
Medalists at the 2008 Summer Olympics
Medalists at the 2004 Summer Olympics
Beach volleyball players at the 2011 Pan American Games
Sportspeople from Curitiba
Pan American Games gold medalists for Brazil
Pan American Games medalists in volleyball
Medalists at the 2011 Pan American Games
21st-century Brazilian people